The Nizam's Contingent, later Hyderabad Contingent, was the army funded by the Nizam of Hyderabad, the ruler of a Princely state of India.

History
The Nizam's Contingent was formed when Richard Wellesley, 1st Marquess Wellesley, brother of Arthur Wellesley, 1st Duke of Wellington, became Governor-General of India and formed a plan to rid India of French influence. His first action, on arriving in India in 1798, was to effect the disbandment of the Indian units of the Nizam under the command of a Frenchman, Monsieur Raymond, officered by non-British Europeans. These soldiers were formed into the British-officered Nizam's Contingent, which fought at the Battle of Seringapatam in 1799 against Tippu Sultan in the final battle of the Fourth Anglo-Mysore War.

The Contingent
In 1813, Sir Henry Russell, then British Resident at the court of the Nizam of Hyderabad, raised the Russell Brigade, comprising two battalions. Later, four more battalions were raised and they were known as the Berar Infantry. In addition, two battalions, known as the Elichpur Brigade, were raised by Nawab Salabat Khan, Subedar of Berar, but formed part of the Nizam's forces. The men of the Russell Brigade were chiefly Hindus, recruited from Oudh and other parts of Uttar Pradesh.

Renaming as Hyderabad contingent
By 1853, at the time of the signing of a treaty between the Nizam and the British, the Nizam's forces consisted of eight battalions. The force was renamed as the Hyderabad Contingent, and served closely alongside the Madras Army of the East India Company.

On 23 October 1917, during the First World War, a Kumaon Battalion was raised at Ranikhet as the "4/39th Kumaon Rifles". In 1918 this unit was redesignated as the 1st battalion, 50th Kumaon Rifles, and a second battalion was raised. These were merged with the Hyderabad Contingent into the 19th Hyderabad Regiment in 1923. Some units of the regiment were demobilized after the First World War, but the regiment was again expanded during the Second World War.

Kumaon Regiment
As links with Hyderabad and Deccan lessened, calls to rename the regiment were heard. On 27 October 1945, the 19th Hyderabad Regiment was incorporated into the Indian Army and renamed the 19th Kumaon Regiment. It later became the Kumaon Regiment.

Meanwhile, with the departure of the British from India in 1947, the Nizam of Hyderabad decided not to accede either to Pakistan or India. For a year, the state was fully independent. In September 1948 in Operation Polo Indian forces invaded Hyderabad and overthrew its Nizam, annexing his state into the Indian Union.

References

British Indian Army regiments
Hyderabad State Forces
Military units and formations established in 1798